Kodiak Benny Benson State Airport  is a public and military use airport located four nautical miles (5 mi, 7 km) southwest of the central business district of Kodiak, a city on Kodiak Island in the U.S. state of Alaska. The airport is state-owned and operated by the Alaska Department of Transportation & Public Facilities (DOT&PF). It is home to the co-located Coast Guard Air Station Kodiak and a hub for Servant Air. On April 11, 2013, the Alaska State Legislature passed SB31, which renamed the facility "Kodiak Benny Benson State Airport," in honor of the designer of the Alaskan flag.

This airport is included in the National Plan of Integrated Airport Systems for 2011–2015, which categorized it as a primary commercial service airport. As per Federal Aviation Administration records, the airport had 82,057 passenger boardings (enplanements) in calendar year 2008, 78,375 enplanements in 2009, and 80,303 in 2010.

History

The airport is on the site of the former Naval Air Station Kodiak which was commissioned in 1941. NAS Kodiak was closed and placed in caretaker status in 1950, with the exception of runways and other facilities used by or conveyed to the U.S. Coast Guard.

In 1947, a Coast Guard Air Detachment was commissioned at NAS Kodiak, which was formally named Coast Guard Air Station Kodiak in 1964. In 1971, the U.S. Navy turned all airport runways and all remaining areas in caretaker status to the north over to the State of Alaska. CGAS Kodiak remains in operation at this location with four HC-130 Hercules, five HH-60J Jayhawk and five HH-65C Dolphin aircraft.

Facilities and aircraft

Kodiak Airport has three asphalt-paved runways: 7/25 measures 7,533 by 150 feet (2,296 x 46 m), 11/29 is 5,400 by 150 feet (1,646 x 46 m), and 18/36 is 5,010 by 150 feet (1,527 x 46 m).

For the 12-month period ending September 4, 2009, the airport had 40,949 aircraft operations, an average of 112 per day: 51% air taxi, 39% military, 6% scheduled commercial, and 4% general aviation. At that time there were 55 aircraft based at this airport: 45.5% single-engine, 14.5% multi-engine, 14.5% helicopter, and 25.5% military.

Airlines and destinations

Passenger

Prior to its bankruptcy and cessation of all operations, Ravn Alaska served the airport from multiple locations.

Historical airline service

According to various editions of the North American Official Airline Guide (OAG) in the 1970s, 1980s and 1990s, Kodiak was previously served by several airlines that operated jet service into the airport. These air carriers included Western Airlines with Boeing 720B jetliner flights nonstop to Seattle as well as Alaska Airlines, MarkAir and Wien Air Alaska with all three carriers operating Boeing 737-200s nonstop to Anchorage (ANC) and AirPac flying British Aerospace BAe 146-100 jetliner service nonstop to ANC as well. Wien also operated Boeing 727-200 jets into the airport with direct, no change of plane 727 service from Reno (RNO), Portland, OR (PDX) and Seattle (SEA) in addition to nonstop 727 service from Anchorage (ANC). In addition, MarkAir served Kodiak with Boeing 737-400 jetliners and in 1994 was flying direct, no change of plane service with this aircraft type to Kodiak from the New York City area, Chicago, Denver and Seattle. MarkAir flight 401 departed New York Newark Airport (EWR) daily at 6:00am, made intermediate stops at Chicago Midway Airport (MDW), Denver (DEN), Seattle (SEA) and Anchorage (ANC), and then arrived in Kodiak at 3:55pm.

Kodiak also had nonstop service to Seattle in earlier years. From the late 1950s to the mid-1960s, Pacific Northern Airlines operated Lockheed Constellation propliners nonstop to Seattle and also direct to Anchorage as well via intermediate stops at Homer and Kenai. Pacific Northern was then acquired by and merged into Western Airlines which continued to operate nonstop service between Kodiak and Seattle, first with the former Pacific Northern Constellation aircraft during the late 1960s (with Western also flying the Constellation direct to Anchorage at this time via a stop in Homer or stops in Homer and Kenai) and then with Boeing 720B jetliners during the early 1970s. Western subsequently ceased all service into Kodiak. By the late 1970s, Wien Air Alaska was flying nonstop Boeing 737-200 jet service to Seattle. In 1994, Alaska Airlines was operating daily one-stop service to Kodiak from Seattle via Anchorage with a Boeing 737-400 jetliner with this flight also providing direct, no change of plane service from Phoenix (PHX) and Portland, OR (PDX). Alaska Airlines is currently the only air carrier operating jet service into the airport with Boeing 737 aircraft.

Statistics

Charters and tours
Charters are generally available to the Kodiak archipelago and Katmai coast.
 Andrew Airways
 Island Air Service

See also
 Integrated Support Command Kodiak
 List of airports in Alaska

References

External links
 Kodiak Military History: Airport
 Airport diagram from FAA Alaska Region
 
 

 

Airports in Kodiak Island Borough, Alaska